Patio is the main village on the island of Taha'a, French Polynesia.

References

Populated places in the Society Islands